
Year 220 BC was a year of the pre-Julian Roman calendar. At the time it was known as the Year of the Consulship of Laevinus/Catulus and Scaevola/Philo (or, less frequently, year 534 Ab urbe condita). The denomination 220 BC for this year has been used since the early medieval period, when the Anno Domini calendar era became the prevalent method in Europe for naming years.

Events 
 By place 
 Greece 
 Together with fellow Illyrian, Scerdilaidas, Demetrius of Pharos attacks Illyrian cities under Roman protection and leads a piratical squadron into Greek waters. They unsuccessfully attack Pylos, an Achaean town on the Messenian coast, in the Peloponnesus of Greece.
 Scerdilaidas and the Aetolians invade Achaea. With the help of Cynaethan traitors, they attack, seize and burn Cynaetha, a town in the north of Arcadia.
 Rome strikes again against the Illyrian pirates precipitating the Second Illyrian War.
 Demetrius seeks refuge with Philip V of Macedon, who is very resentful of the Roman interference. Rome occupies Demetrius' chief fortresses, Pharos and Dimillos.
 Aratus of Sicyon counters Aetolian aggression by obtaining the assistance of the Hellenic League now under the leadership of Philip V of Macedon. In the resulting Social War, the Hellenic League of Greek states is assembled in Corinth at Philip V's instigation. He then leads the Hellenic League in battles against Aetolia, Sparta and Elis.
 The Gortynians occupy Matala, on the island of Crete.

 Seleucid Empire 
 With Molon occupying significant parts of the Seleucid kingdom and assuming the title of king, on the advice of his chief Minister, Hermeias, Antiochus III abandons a campaign to conquer southern Syria from Egypt. Antiochus III instead marches against Molon, defeating and killing him and his brother Alexander on the far bank of the Tigris. Antiochus goes on to conquer Atropatene, the north-western part of Media.
 Meanwhile, the birth of a son to Antiochus III and Laodice (daughter of Mithridates II, king of Pontus) leads Hermeias to consider getting rid of the king so that he can rule under the name of the infant son. Antiochus discovers the scheme and arranges the assassination of Hermeias.

 Anatolia 
 Antiochus III's commander in Anatolia, Achaeus, having recovered all the districts which Attalus of Pergamum has gained, is accused by Hermeias, the chief minister of Antiochus, of intending to revolt. In self-defence, Achaeus assumes the title of king and rules over the Anatolian parts of the Seleucid kingdom.

 Egypt 
 Arsinoe III marries her brother, King Ptolemy IV of Egypt.

 Roman Republic 
 During his censorship, the Roman political leader, Gaius Flaminius, builds the Circus Flaminius on the Campus Martius and constructs the Via Flaminia from Rome to Ariminum (Rimini).

 China 
 Qin Shi Huang begins a system of tree-lined roads to interconnect all parts of China, and begins to join regional walls to form the beginnings of the Great Wall (Wan li chang cheng).
 Around this time, Prime Minister Li Si publishes Cangjiepian, a primer on the new orthographic standard for all of China, the Small Seal Script.

 By topic 
 Art 
 A bronze statue called Gallic Chieftain killing his wife and himself is made (approximate date). A Roman copy after the original statue is today preserved at Museo Nazionale Romano in Rome.
 A bronze statue called Dying Gallic trumpeter is made (possibly by Epigonos) (230-220 BC). A marble Roman copy after the original statue is today preserved at Museo Capitolino in Rome.

Births 
 Attalus II Philadelphus, king of Pergamon and founder of modern-day Turkish city Antalya (d. 138 BC)
 Pacuvius, Roman tragic poet and writer (d. c. 130 BC)
 Tiberius Gracchus the Elder, father of the Roman political reformer Tiberius Gracchus (approximate date) (d. 154 BC)

Deaths 
 Conon of Samos, Greek mathematician and astronomer whose work on conic sections (curves of the intersections of a right circular cone with a plane) serves as the basis for the fourth book of the Conics of Apollonius of Perga (b. c. 280 BC)
 Molon, general of the Seleucid king Antiochus III who has rebelled against his rule
 Hermeias, the favourite and chief minister of the Seleucid king Seleucus III and, for a short time, chief minister to Antiochus III

References